{{Taxobox
| name = Marinobacterium sediminicola
| domain = Bacteria
| phylum = Pseudomonadota
| classis = Gammaproteobacteria
| ordo = Alteromonadales
| familia = Alteromonadaceae
| genus = Marinobacterium
| species = M. sediminicola| binomial = Marinobacterium sediminicola| binomial_authority = Huo et al. 2009
| type_strain = CGMCC 1.7287, JCM 15524, CN47
| subdivision = 
| synonyms = 
}}Marinobacterium sediminicola'  is a Gram-negative, non-spore-forming and strictly aerobic bacterium from the genus of Marinobacterium'' which has been isolated from sediments from the East China Sea.

References

External links
Type strain of Marinobacterium sediminicola at BacDive -  the Bacterial Diversity Metadatabase

 

Alteromonadales
Bacteria described in 2009